The Great Pretenders is the second album by Los Angeles band Mini Mansions. It was released on March 23, 2015. The album cover alludes to the cover of the Voyager Golden Record.

Reception

The Great Pretenders received great acclaim from contemporary music critics. At Metacritic, which assigns a normalized rating out of 100 to reviews from mainstream critics, the album received an average score of 84, based on 7 reviews, which indicates "universal acclaim".

Track listing

Personnel
Personnel adapted from The Greater Pretenders liner notes.

Mini Mansions

 Zach Dawes
Tyler Parkford
 Michael Shuman

Additional musicians

 Brian Wilson - vocals (track 5)
 Alex Turner - vocals (track 6)

Production

 Mini Mansions - production
 T Bone Burnett - executive producer
 Woody Jackson - co-production
 Michael Harris - production, engineering
 Sean O'Brien - engineering (tracks 1, 3, 6, and 9)
 Wesley Seidman - engineering (track 5)
 Gavin Lurssen - mastering
 John Congleton - mixing
 Cian Riordan - mixing (track 10)

Artwork

 Clay Russell Lerner - design
 Kendrick Brinson - back cover photography 
 Neil Krug - insert photography
 NASA - cover photography

References

2015 albums
Mini Mansions albums
Albums recorded at Electro-Vox Recording Studios